The International Women's Media Foundation (IWMF), located in Washington, D.C., is an organization working internationally to elevate the status of women in the media. The IWMF has created programs to help women in the media develop practical solutions to the obstacles they face in their careers and lives. The IWMF's work includes a wide range of programs including international reporting fellowships in Africa and Latin America and providing grant opportunities for women journalists, research into the status of women in the media, and the Courage in Journalism, Anja Niedringhaus Courage in Photojournalism, and Lifetime Achievement Awards. The IWMF advocates for press freedom internationally  and often forms petitions asking international governments to release journalists in captivity and offer protection to journalists in danger.

History

In March 2011, the IWMF organized an international conference of women leaders at George Washington University in order to commemorate the organization's twentieth anniversary and reflect on the status of women in the media.

In 2011, the IWMF published a report titled Global Report on the Status of Women in the News Media.

Courage Awards
The IWMF annually awards woman journalists The Courage in Journalism Award and photojournalists The Anja Niedringhaus Courage in Photojournalism Award. These awards "[honor] women journalists who set themselves apart by their extraordinary bravery". According to the IWMF, Courage in Journalism Awards winners have "[faced] and [survived] danger to uncover the truth, [and raised] the bar for reporting under duress". The awards are presented each year at ceremonies in New York and Los Angeles.

The 2010 Courage in Journalism Award winners were Claudia Duque (Colombia), Tsering Woeser (Tibet) and Vicky Ntetema (Tanzania).
 The 2013 Courage in Journalism Award winners were "Najiba Ayubi, director of The Killid Group in Afghanistan; Nour Kelze, a photographer for Reuters in Syria; Bopha Phorn, a reporter for The Cambodia Daily, and Edna Machirori, the first black female editor of a newspaper in Zimbabwe." The event was hosted by Cindi Leive and Olivia Wilde at the Beverly Hills Hotel.
 The 2014 Courage in Journalism Award winners were Arwa Damon (CNN, Lebanon), Solange Lusiku Nsimire (Le Souverain, Democratic Republic of the Congo) and Brankica Stanković  (RTV B92, Serbia).
 In 2020, The Kashmiri photojournalist, Masrat Zahra, was awarded with Anja Niedringhaus Courage in Photojournalism Award. Laurel Chor of Hong Kong and Nahira Montcourt of Puerto Rico received Honorable Mentions.  Gulchehra Hoja, Uyghur American journalist with Radio Free Asia; Solafa Magdy of Egypt; Yakeen Bido of Syria; and Jessikka Aro of Finland received the Courage in Journalism Award.
 In 2022, Courage in Journalism Awards were given to Americans Lynsey Addario and Cerise Castle and Ukrainian Victoria Roshchyna. Chinese columnist Huang Xueqin was awarded the Wallis Annenberg Justice for Women Journalists Award, given to a journalist who is unjustly imprisoned.

Lifetime Achievement Awards
The IWMF also honors women who have had groundbreaking careers in journalism with the Lifetime Achievement Awards. According to the IWMF, Lifetime Achievement Award winners "kicked down barriers to make it possible for women all over the world to find their voices and make them heard". Award recipients include Alma Guillermoprieto from Mexico (2010), Amira Hass from Israel (2009) and Edith Lederer from the United States (2008).

Leadership Institute for Women Journalists
In 1998 the IWMF launched an annual week-long Leadership Institute for veteran woman journalists. The institutes train women to maintain successful careers in media organizations and provide the necessary skills to allow women to become leaders in their newsrooms. Veteran newswomen come together to share leadership styles, strategies for managing people and change, tips for negotiating salary, navigating politics and balancing work and home. These institutes are held in the U.S. as well as worldwide. The 2009 U.S. Leadership Institute was held in Chicago, July 20–22. Past Institutes have been held in Mali (2010), Uganda (2009) and Lithuania (2008).

Africa
The Leadership Institutes in Africa began in 1998 in Zimbabwe. The IWMF pioneered leadership training for women journalists in Africa. Training is conducted in English-speaking and French-speaking African nations, including one in Kampala, Uganda (2009) and Bamako, Mali (2010).

Europe
The Leadership Institutes in Europe began in the 1990s. The most recent institute was held in 2008 for women journalists from the former Soviet Republics. Participants discussed the challenges of media management, the perception of women journalists in the former Soviet Republics and the qualities and attitudes that produce inspired and inspiring leaders. The institute was held in Vilnius, Lithuania.

Latin America
The Leadership Institutes in Latin America began in Mexico in 1998. Past institutes have been held in Nicaragua, Argentina and Ecuador (2001). Additional training was provided online to Latin American women journalists in 2004.

United States
The Leadership Institutes in the U.S. provide critical career building skills and the opportunity to network with colleagues. Women news executives use role-playing and other practical exercises to demonstrate leadership styles and share strategies. The sixth annual U.S. Leadership Institute was held July 2009 in Chicago. During the three months following the institute, participants received one-on-one coaching on implementing personalized action plans developed during the institute.

Elizabeth Neuffer Fellowship
One woman journalist who covers human rights and social justice issues is chosen annually for the Elizabeth Neuffer Fellowship. The program is named for Elizabeth Neuffer, a 1998 IWMF Courage in Journalism Award winner and Boston Globe correspondent who was killed in Iraq in May 2003. The IWMF Elizabeth Neuffer Fellowship perpetuates her memory and advances her life mission of promoting international understanding of human rights and social justice.

This fellowship gives the journalist the opportunity to spend an academic year in a tailored program at the Massachusetts Institute of Technology's Center for International Studies with access to The Boston Globe and The New York Times. The flexible structure of the program provides the fellows with opportunities to pursue academic research and hone reporting skills covering topics related to human rights. Past Neuffer Fellows have been from Colombia, Australia, Iraq and the United States.

Reporting on Agriculture and Women Project
The Reporting on Agriculture and Women Project is changing the way the media cover agriculture, rural development and farming stories. The IWMF provides training to journalists to help them effectively provide coverage of agriculture and the role of women in transforming food production and rural development in African countries.

The project's goals include raising the quantity and quality of reporting on farming and rural development, focusing more reporting on the importance of women to the economics of rural areas and creating more gender equality in newsrooms. In February 2009 the IWMF published its research in a publication titled Sowing the Seeds, which revealed three key findings:
 Even though agriculture plays a crucial role for Africa's economic growth, it comprises only four percent of media coverage.
 Whether female or male, farmers' voices are seldom heard in agricultural coverage. In the agricultural stories monitored 70 percent of the sources were government officials and experts/professionals. Only 20 percent were farmers and other rural/agricultural workers.
 Women are almost invisible in the media. Even though women produce 70 percent of food in sub-Saharan Africa and make up half of the region's population just 11 percent of the sources and 22 percent of the reporters are women.

Using the same model as the Maisha Yetu project, Centers of Excellence were created in L'Essor and Radio Klédu in Mali, The Daily Monitor and Uganda Broadcasting Corporation in Uganda and The Times of Zambia and Zambia National Broadcasting Corporation in Zambia. The IWMF staff and experienced local trainers provide on-site training to journalists.

The Maisha Yetu project
The Maisha Yetu project was a project that the IWMF created in 2002 with a $1.5 million grant from the Bill & Melinda Gates Foundation. Its purpose was to enhance the quality and consistency of reporting on HIV/AIDS, TB and malaria in Africa. The first phase of the project was qualitative and quantitative research on how the media cover HIV/AIDS, TB and malaria, which was published as Deadline for Health: The Media's Response to Covering HIV/AIDS, TB and Malaria in Africa.

The second phase of Maisha Yetu was the creation of Centers of Excellence in three African countries with the goal of creating practical, sustainable measures to help African media improve their health coverage. A report on the project, Writing for Our Lives: How the Maisha Yetu Project Changed Health Coverage in Africa, was published in July 2006. A conference was also held in Johannesburg, South Africa in July 2006, where representatives from the Centers of Excellence shared their experiences with representatives from key African media and nongovernmental and women's organizations.

Reporta

In September 2015, the IWMF released a free mobile security app designed for journalists. The app was received critically by security experts because the app was closed-source; the IWMF has not published the reports of the audits that it claims to have done; the IWMF has access to the contents of the messages that are sent with the app as well as the locations of its users; and because the app's privacy policy states that the IWMF reserves the right to share this data with a wide variety of third parties, respond to subpoenas and court orders from an unspecified number of jurisdictions, and to modify the privacy policy at any time without prior notice to the app's users. Reverse engineering of the app revealed that "every action is logged", that the user's last locations are stored in plaintext and that the app uses an insecure encryption protocol when connecting to the IWMF's server. In response, the IWMF announced that they would release the application's source code under an open-source license. Security researchers were still critical of the IWMF's model of collecting and storing personal data unencrypted. The IWMF released the source code for the iOS and Android versions of the mobile app as well as its backend database server as free and open-source software under the GPLv3 license in January 2016.

See also
 Women in journalism and media professions

References

External links

Women's occupational organizations
International journalism organizations
1990 establishments in the United States
International women's organizations
Organizations based in Washington, D.C.